Surendra Prakash Goel (1 January 1946 – 14 August 2020), was an Indian politician from Gaziabad, Uttar Pradesh. He died due to COVID-19 during the COVID-19 pandemic in India in Delhi on 14 August 2020.

Life
He stood for the 2004 Lok Sabha elections on the Indian National Congress (INC) ticket and won from Ghaziabad-Hapur. He was defeated by the president of BJP Rajnath Singh in the next general elections in 2009. He was defeated again by Suresh Bansal of BSP in 2012 assembly elections. As of 2012, he was charged with one criminal case for preventing a public servant from discharging Government duties.

Citations

1946 births
2020 deaths
Indian National Congress politicians
Politicians from Ghaziabad
India MPs 2004–2009
People from Hapur district
Deaths from the COVID-19 pandemic in India
Indian National Congress politicians from Uttar Pradesh